Police Rescue is an Australian television series which originally aired on ABC TV between 1989 and 1996. It was produced by ABC and Southern Star Xanadu in association with the BBC.

Apart from the 61 episodes, there was a 90-minute pilot episode (first screened in 1989) as well as a feature film in 1994, starring Zoe Carides.

The series dealt with the New South Wales Police Rescue Squad based in Sydney and their work attending to various incidents from road accidents to train crashes.  The show was very well received for the first four series, however a decline in ratings by the commencement of the 1996 series saw the cancellation of the show, following an almost epitaph in the final three episodes.

Police Rescue was shown in the United Kingdom first on BBC1 and later on Sky One, in the Czech Republic as Záchranáři on TV Nova, in South Africa as "Noodroep" (dubbed in Afrikaans),  in parts of Italy as Polizia Squadra Soccorso on T9, in France on TF1 as Sydney Police, in Germany on VOX as Police Rescue – Gefährlicher Einsatz, in Norway, Sweden, the Netherlands and Denmark on the United Kingdom-based TV3, and in the Republic of Ireland on RTÉ.

Cast

Main

Recurring minor cast

Episodes

Pilot movie

In mid-1989, Southern Star Xanadu broadcast the pilot episode of Police Rescue via the Australian Broadcasting Corporation. The 90-minute telemovie established the background of the protagonist of the series, Sergeant "Mickey" McClintock. Several issues were raised in the pilot, such as women's discrimination, sexism and street violence. The plot evolved around the entrance of the first woman member to the Police Rescue Squad, Constable Georgia Rattray and then the search for a missing boy in Sydney's sewer system.

Season 1 (1991)
The telemovie was well received and spawned the series of Police Rescue, which carried on shortly after the pilot.

Season 2 (1992)

Season 3 (1993)

Feature Film and TV Special (1994)

Season 4 (1995)

Season 5 (1996)

Home Media 
Between 1993-1994 Village Roadshow Released Selected Episodes on VHS.

In 1994 CIC-TAFT Video Released Police Rescue (The Movie) on VHS.

The First Police Rescue DVD Release was in November 2006 With Season One Released. The Following year Warner Vision Released Seasons 2 and 2 in April 2007 and In July 2007 the Final Seasons 4 and 5 were Released.

The Second Police Rescue DVD Release was in November 2017 with Via Vision Entertainment Re-Releasing Police Rescue as a Complete Boxset (Seasons 1-5 + Pilot Movie)

As Of 27 May 2019 - Police Rescue: The Movie (1994) is still not available on DVD.

As Of 21 July 2019 - Police Rescue: In Action is still not available on DVD.

In July 2019, the Seven Network released the complete first season and second season of Police Rescue via video on demand on 7plus.

VHS Releases

DVD Releases

Online Streaming 
Police Rescue is currently streaming on multiple streaming around the world.

7 plus Australia - Streaming Police Rescue Seasons 01-05.

10 play Australia - Streaming Police Rescue Season 01-05.

Amazon Prime - Streaming Police Rescue Seasons 01-05.

Police Rescue Collectables

References 

 Police Rescue at Internet Movie Database
 Police Rescue: The Movie at Internet Movie Database
 WarnerVision
 Police Rescue at epguides

External links 
 
 Police Rescue at the National Film and Sound Archive
 Police Rescue – "By the Book" at Australian Screen Online
 Police Rescue – "Mates" at Australian Screen Online
Police Rescue: The Film at Oz Movies
 Rescue Bahawalpur  – "By urdu Wikipedia" at Pakistan Screen Online

Australian Broadcasting Corporation original programming
Australian drama television series
Television shows set in Sydney
1989 Australian television series debuts
1996 Australian television series endings
Police procedural television series
Television series by Endemol Australia